Romanzo is a given name. Notable people with the name include:

Romanzo Bunn (1829–1909), American lawyer and judge
Romanzo E. Davis (1831–1908), farmer and merchant from Middleton, Wisconsin, member of the Wisconsin State Senate
Edwin Romanzo Elmer (1850–1923), American portrait, genre and still life painter

See also
Romansa (disambiguation)
Romanz
Romanza
Romanzado

it:Romanzo